Dust is the seventh full-length album by German electronic producer Ellen Allien.

Track listing 
"Our Utopie" - 4:11
"Flashy Flashy" - 4:23
"My Tree" - 3:48
"Sun The Rain" - 4:27
"Should We Go Home" - 6:54
"Ever" - 6:10
"You" - 2:50
"Dream" - 4:27
"Huibuh" - 4:33
"Schlumi" - 4:08

Reception

References

Ellen Allien albums
2010 albums
BPitch Control albums